Gerardo Galeote Quecedo (born January 27, 1957, in São Paulo, Brazil) is a lawyer and former Spanish Member of the European Parliament from 1994 to 2009. He was elected on the People's Party ticket and sat with the European People's Party group. He was also the party spokesman.

On July 23, 2004, he was elected Chair of the Committee on Regional Development.

In April 2009, Galeote announced that he would not stand for reelection to the European Parliament in the June 2009 elections. Gerardo Galeote was never accused and was left out of the investigation from Gurtel, however the press around the case, caused irreparable damage to his career. From 2009 to 2014 he was an Advisor to the president Mariano Rajoy. He left the party and his career in politics in 2014.

References

1957 births
Living people
People's Party (Spain) MEPs
MEPs for Spain 1999–2004
MEPs for Spain 2004–2009